"I Don't Wanna Dance" is a song written by Tim Finn and recorded by Split Enz. It was released in June 1981 as the third single from their seventh studio album, Waiata. Lead vocals were by Finn in which his voice constantly changes throughout the song.

Track listing
Australia/New Zealand 7"
"I Don't Wanna Dance"
"Shark Attack (Live)"
"What's the Matter With You (Live)"

U.S. promo 12"
"I Don't Wanna Dance"
"Hard Act To Follow"
"History Never Repeats"

Personnel 
 Tim Finn – vocals
 Neil Finn – vocals, guitar
 Noel Crombie – percussion
 Malcolm Green – drums
 Nigel Griggs – bass
 Eddie Rayner – vocals, keyboards

Charts

References

Split Enz songs
1981 singles
Songs written by Tim Finn
1980 songs
Mushroom Records singles